The sixth competition weekend of the 2010–11 ISU Speed Skating World Cup was held in the Krylatskoye Skating Hall in Moscow, Russia, on 28–30 January 2011.

Schedule of events
The schedule of the event is below:

Medal summary

Men's events

Women's events

References

6
Isu World Cup, 2010-11, 6
Sports competitions in Moscow